Michał Kołodziejski (born 12 February 1975) is a Polish diplomat specializing in Asia-Pacific region, who serves as the ambassador of Poland to Australia from 2017 to 2022.

Michał Kołodziejski graduated from University of Warsaw – Japanese studies and management. He also studied at Kanazawa University and completed a Ph.D. course at Warsaw School of Economics.

In 2003 he joined the Ministry of Foreign Affairs. He worked at the Embassy of Poland in Singapore, and then as a deputy director and director of Asia-Pacific Department (2014–2017). On 26 November 2017 he started his term as the ambassador of Poland to Australia, based in Canberra, accredited also to Papua New Guinea, Fiji, Federated States of Micronesia, Nauru, Vanuatu, Marshall Islands and Solomon Islands. He presented his credentials to the Governor-General of Australia Peter Cosgrove on 2 February 2018, to the president of Fiji George Konrote on 12 February 2019, to the president of the Federated States of Micronesia Peter M. Christian on 18 March 2019. He ended his term on 15 August 2022. Since 1 October 2022 he serves as a deputy director of the MFA Asia-Pacific Department.

Besides Polish, he speaks English, Japanese and Russian. He is married with two daughters.

Works 

 Takahashi Korekiyo 1854–1936 a gospodarka międzywojennej Japonii, Warszawa: Trio, 2004.

References 

1975 births
Ambassadors of Poland to Australia
Japanologists
Living people
University of Warsaw alumni